Michitarō, Michitaro or Michitarou (written: 道太郎) is a masculine Japanese given name. Notable people with the name include:

 (1885–1940), Japanese general
 (1890–1966), Imperial Japanese Navy admiral

Japanese masculine given names